Reginald Sampson (3 April 1899 – 2 April 1955) was an Australian rules footballer who played with South Melbourne in the Victorian Football League (VFL).

Family
The son of Britain Sampson (1865–1925) and Ellen Maria Sampson, nee Williams, Reginald Sampson was born at Box Hill on 3 April 1899.

Football
Sampson played 25 games over four seasons with South Melbourne, only managing to establish himself as a consistent member of the side in 1919.

In 1922, Sampson transferred to Footscray (then in the Victorian Football Association) where he played for two seasons.

Notes

External links 

Reg Sampson's playing statistics from The VFA Project

1899 births
1955 deaths
Australian rules footballers from Melbourne
Sydney Swans players
Footscray Football Club (VFA) players
People from Box Hill, Victoria